Gary D. Sinclair (born 1952), known professionally as Michael Gary "M.G." Kelly and Machine Gun Kelly, is an American actor, disc jockey, and radio personality. In addition to hosting several radio programs over the years, Kelly has held several acting roles as a disc jockey; also, he has served as an offstage announcer on two game shows.

His stage name is a reference to George "Machine Gun" Kelly, a notorious criminal.

Radio career

Kelly has hosted and produced several radio programs. Several are still airing on stations across the United States and Canada; production and distribution of his current shows went on a brief hiatus in the late 2000s but have since resumed.  He worked at KSTP in the Minneapolis/St. Paul market from 1972 through 1975. During the 1970s and '80s, Kelly enjoyed much success as a radio personality on Los Angeles radio stations KHJ, KTNQ, KOST and KODJ.

Programs produced by Kelly include:

Live from the 60s (1986–93, reruns from 1993–96 and 2015–present), hosted by "The Real Don Steele," a retrospective on the 1960s featuring 1960s music, distributed by Premiere Networks. Reruns as of 2015 distributed by Compass Media Networks.
American Hit List (1998–present) similar in format to Live from the 60s except hosted by Kelly himself. This series featured a broader playlist stretching the 1950s to the 1970s, with a focus on 1964-73. This is the only Kelly program distributed by Westwood One. An updated version, Classic Hit List, has also been offered since the mid-2010s, which includes more 1980s songs and a classic rock lean; this show is currently distributed by Compass Media Networks.
Back to the 70s (1998-2007, 2011–present). First 52 episodes hosted by Charlie Tuna, airing in reruns through 2007; subsequent revival (ca. 2011) hosted by Kelly himself and distributed by Compass.
The Amazing 80s (1998–present) hosted by Kelly, marketed as a direct competitor to Backtrax USA. Distributed by Compass.
Your 90s Rewind (2015–present) hosted by Kelly.
Top 30 USA (1980s), AC Radio top 30 countdown (or as the show implies a CountUP show) hosted by Kelly and distributed by CBS Radio
Your Good Time Oldies Magazine (1992–95), co-hosted by Kelly and Charlie Tuna

Acting career

M. G. Kelly's acting career includes a typecast role as DJ "Bebe Jesús" in the 1976 Barbra Streisand version of A Star Is Born and the role of Father John Voss in the Clint Eastwood movie The Enforcer, as well as many television roles, including two CHiPs episodes from 1978 and the classic WKRP in Cincinnati "Fish Story" episode in 1979. He also provided the voice of the archvillian The Lightning Bug in the 1979 serial spoof J-Men Forever.

In addition to acting, Kelly served a short stint as announcer on the game show The Pop 'N Rocker Game, hosted by Jon Bauman. In late 1988, he took over as the announcer on Wheel of Fortune following the death of former announcer Jack Clark in mid-1988. Kelly announced both the daytime network version of the show and the nighttime, syndicated version hosted by Pat Sajak until March 1989. Kelly was succeeded by Charlie O'Donnell, the original announcer of the daytime version, who remained with the show until his death in 2010.

Partial filmography
 1976 A Star Is Born as Bebe Jesus
 1976 The Enforcer as Father John
 1978 The Buddy Holly Story as Avalon M.C.
 1978 The Fifth Floor as Hal
 1979 Roller Boogie as D.J.
 1979 J-Men Forever as Lightning Bug (voice)
 1984 Voyage of the Rock Aliens as Radio DJ
 1984 Night Patrol as Hotel Manager
 1989 Body Slam as T.V. Interviewer
 1989 Lobster Man from Mars as Big Dick Strange
 1989 UHF as Promo Announcer (voice)

References

External links
Official M. G. Kelly productions website

1952 births
Living people
American male film actors
Game show announcers
People from Ada, Oklahoma
Radio personalities from Oklahoma